Mauger may refer to:

Mauger (French name), a Norman surname
Mauger (Jamaican Patois term), a term used in rural Jamaica for a thin woman

People with the given name
Mauger of Hauteville (died 1050s), son of Tancred of Hauteville
Mauger (Archbishop of Rouen) (c. 1019–1055), son of Richard II, Duke of Normandy
Mauger, Count of Corbeil, 11th century Norman, son of Richard I of Normandy
Mauger, Count of Troina (died after 1098), son of Roger I of Sicily
Mauger of Worcester (died 1212), bishop of Worcester

People with the surname
Aaron Mauger (born 1980), New Zealand rugby union player
Ivan Mauger (1939–2018), New Zealand former world motorcycle speedway champion
Jacques Mauger (born 1959), French trombone player
Nathan Mauger (born 1978), New Zealand rugby union player
Quincy Mauger (born 1995), American football player
Samuel Mauger (1857–1936), Australian politician

See also
Le Mesnil-Mauger, a commune in the Calvados department, France